Newton Centre is a light rail station on the MBTA Green Line D branch, located in the Newton Centre village of Newton, Massachusetts. A former regional rail station, it was converted for light rail use and reopened on July 4, 1959, along with the rest of the line. The 1891-built station and express office are part of the Newton Railroad Stations Historic District, which was placed on the National Register of Historic Places in 1976.

History

The first station at this site opened in 1852 on Langley Road as a part of the Charles River Railroad. The Boston and Albany Railroad commissioned a building which design was started by H. H. Richardson in 1886, the year of his death, and which design was finished by Richardson’s successor firm of Shepley, Rutan, and Coolidge. The new station, built by the Norcross Brothers firm of Worcester, opened in 1891. The station was heavily modified in 1907 when the line was sunk below grade to eliminate street crossings.

The Highland branch was closed in 1958 and quickly converted for light rail use. The station building was rented out as commercial space; by 1962, it housed a clothing store. Until 2008, it housed a Starbucks coffee shop containing a sign that indicated when a Boston-bound train arrived. However, the shop was closed in October 2008 as part of Starbucks' restructuring campaign due to the Great Recession. The Deluxe Station Diner, a satellite restaurant of the Deluxe Town Diner in Watertown, opened in the newly renovated building in December 2010. Deluxe Station Diner morphed into Jamie's on Union in September 2020 which closed in August 2022. The space currently sits vacant.

In the early 2000s, the MBTA modified key surface stops with raised platforms for accessibility as part of the Light Rail Accessibility Program. The renovation of Newton Centre was completed around 2002. Around 2006, the MBTA added a wooden mini-high platform on the inbound side, allowing level boarding on older Type 7 LRVs. These platforms were installed at eight Green Line stations in 2006–07 as part of the settlement of Joanne Daniels-Finegold, et al. v. MBTA.

In October 2012, the MBTA changed the station name from Newton Center to Newton Centre to match the village name.

References

External links

MBTA - Newton Centre
May 1968 photo of Newton Center station
 Union Street entrance from Google Maps Street View
 Braeland Avenue entrance from Google Maps Street View

Green Line (MBTA) stations
Railway stations in Middlesex County, Massachusetts
Railway stations in the United States opened in 1959
Former Boston and Albany Railroad stations
Railway stations in the United States opened in 1852